Herb is a given name that is usually a diminutive of the name Herbert.

People

Herbert
Herb Aach (1923–1985), American painter and writer
Herb Abramson (1916–1999), American music executive 
Herb Adderley (1939–2020), American football player
Herb Alpert (born 1935), American musician
Herb Andress (1935–2004), Austrian actor
Herb Baumeister (1947–1996), American suspected serial killer
Herb Boxer (born 1947), American ice-hockey player
Herb Brooks (1937–2003), American ice hockey coach
Herb Brown (born 1936), American basketball coach
Herb Caen (1916–1997), American journalist
Herb Carneal (1923–2007), American sportscaster
Herb Carnegie (1919–2012), Canadian ice hockey player
Herb Chambers (born 1940), American billionaire businessman
Herb Cohen (1932–2010), American music executive
Herb Coleman (disambiguation), multiple people
Herb Conaway (born 1963), American politician
Herb Covington (1902–1990), American football player
Herb Denenberg (1929–2010), American journalist, lawyer, and consumer advocate
Herb Donaldson (lawyer) (1927–2008), American lawyer and judge
Herb Drury (1896–1965), Canadian-American ice hockey player
Herb Edelman (1933–1996), American actor
Herb Elliott (born 1938), Australian runner
Herb Ellis (1921–2010), American jazz guitarist
Herb Epp (1934–2013), Canadian politician
Herb Fame (born 1942), one half of musical duo Peaches & Herb
Herb Fitzgibbon (born 1942), American tennis player
Herb Flam (1928–1980), American tennis player
Herb Foster (1913–2003), Canadian ice hockey player
Herb Franta (1905–1950), American football player
Herb Gilbert (1888–1972), Australian rugby league and rugby union footballer
Herb Gilbert Jr. (1917–1983), Australian rugby league footballer
Herb Gray (1931–2014), Canadian politician and deputy prime minister
Herb Gray (Canadian football) (1934-2011), American lineman in the Canadian Football League
Herb Grosch (1918–2010), Canadian computer scientist
Herb Jackson (baseball) (1883–1922), American baseball pitcher
Herb Jeffries (1913–2014), American actor
Herb Joesting (1905–1963), American football player and coach
Herb Jordan (1884–1973), Canadian ice hockey player
Herb Kawainui Kāne (1928–2011), American artist
Herb Kaplow (1927–2013), American broadcast journalist
Herb Kelleher (1931–2019), American businessman
Herb Kent (1928–2016), American radio personality
Herb Klein (disambiguation), multiple people
Herb Kohl (born 1935), American politician
Herb Lance (1925–2006), American singer-songwriter and record producer
Herb Levinson (1929–2012), American actor
Herb Lilburne (1908–1976), New Zealand rugby union and rugby league footballer
Herb Louch (1875–1936), Australian rules footballer
Herb Lubalin (1918–1981), American graphic designer
Herb Magidson (1906–1986), American lyricist
Herb Matthews Sr. (1894–1964), Australian rules footballer
Herb Matthews Jr. (born 1943), Australian rules footballer
Herb Nolan (1875–1933), Australian rules footballer
Herb Orvis (1946–2020), American football player
Herb Pardes (born 1932), American psychiatrist
Herb Pedersen (born 1944), American singer-songwriter and guitarist
Herb Pennock (1894–1948), American baseball pitcher and executive
Herb Peterson (1919–2008), American food scientist
Herb Peyton (born 1932), American energy executive
Herb Pfuhl (1928–2011), American educator and politician
Herb Plews (1928–2014), American baseball player
Herb Pomeroy (1930–2007), American jazz trumpeter
Herb Raybourn (1935–2017), American baseball player and scout
Herb Reed (1928–2012), American R&B singer
Herb Rich (1928–2008), American football player
Herb Ritts (1952–2002), American photographer
Herb Rozell (born 1931), American politician 
Herb Score (1933–2008), American baseball pitcher and broadcaster
Herb Sendek (born 1963), American basketball coach
Herb Shriner (1918–1970), American humorist
Herb Steinohrt (1899–1985), Australian rugby league footballer
Herb Stempel (1926–2020), American game show contestant
Herb Taylor (American football) (born 1984), American football player
Herb Thomas (1923–2000), American racing driver
Herb Thomas (outfielder) (1902–1991), American baseball player and manager
Herb Trimpe (1939–2015), American comics artist
Herb Voland (1918–1981), American actor
Herb Wallerstein (1925–1985), American television producer and director
Herb Washington (born 1951), American sprinter and baseball player
Herb Waters (born 1992), American football player
Herb Wiedoeft (1886–1928), German-born American bandleader
Herb Wilkinson (born 1923), American basketball player
Herb Williams (born 1958), American basketball player and coach
Herb Wright (1917–2015), American earth scientist

Other or indeterminate
Herb Capozzi (1925–2011), Canadian athlete, businessman, sports team manager and politician
Herb Dean (born 1970), American mixed martial arts referee
Herb Miller (born 1997), American football player
Herb Robertson (born 1951), jazz musician
Herb Scharfman (1912–1998), American photographer 
Herb Wesson (born 1951), American politician

Characters
Herb (Ranma ½), in the manga series Ranma ½
Herb Melnick, from the television series Two and a Half Men
Herb Tarlek, from the television series WKRP in Cincinnati
Herb Copperbottom, from the film Robots
Herb Muddlefoot, from the animated series Darkwing Duck
Herbert Powell, from the animated series The Simpsons
 Herb Kazzaz, from the animated series BoJack Horseman
 Prince Herb, nickname given to Sal Vulcano for the ninth season of the television show Impractical Jokers
 Herb, from a 1980s Burger King advertising campaign
 Herb Star, father of Patrick Star from the animated series SpongeBob SquarePants

See also
 Herb (surname)

Masculine given names
Hypocorisms